The 2014–15 San Diego State men's basketball team represented San Diego State University during the 2014–15 NCAA Division I men's basketball season. This was head coach Steve Fisher's sixteenth season at San Diego State. The Aztecs played their home games at Viejas Arena. They were members in the Mountain West Conference. They finished the season 27–9, 14–4 in Mountain West play to finish in a tie for the Mountain West regular season championship. They advanced to the championship game of the Mountain West tournament where they lost to Wyoming. They received an at-large bid to the NCAA tournament where they defeated St. John's in the second round before losing in the third round to Duke.

Previous season
The 2013–14 San Diego State Aztecs finished the season with an overall record of 31–5, and 16–2 in the Mountain West to win regular season championship. In the MWC tournament, the Aztecs defeated Utah State and UNLV to make it to the championship game, where they lost to New Mexico, 58–64. The Aztecs received an at-large bid to the 2014 NCAA tournament as a 4-seed in the West Region. The team defeated 13-seed New Mexico State and 12-seed North Dakota State to make it to the Sweet Sixteen, where they eventually lost to 1-seed Arizona, 64–70.

Off-season

Departures

2014 Recruiting Class

Roster

Schedule

|-
!colspan=9 style="background:#C23038; color:#231F20;"| Exhibition

|-
!colspan=9 style="background:#C23038; color:#231F20;"| Non-conference regular season

|-
!colspan=9 style="background:#C23038;"| Mountain West regular season

|-
!colspan=9 style="background:#C23038; color:#231F20;"| Mountain West tournament

|-
!colspan=9 style="background:#C23038;"| NCAA tournament

Rankings

*AP does not release post-NCAA Tournament rankings.

References

San Diego State Aztecs men's basketball seasons
San Diego State
San Diego State